Cwmaman Crossing Halt railway station served the village of Cwmaman, in the historical county of Glamorganshire, Wales, from 1906 to 1932 on the Vale of Neath Railway.

History 
The station was opened on 1 January 1906 by the Great Western Railway. It was a short-lived station, closing to passengers on 22 September 1924 and closing to the workers of the nearby colliery in 1932.

References 

Disused railway stations in Rhondda Cynon Taf
Former Great Western Railway stations
Railway stations in Great Britain opened in 1906
Railway stations in Great Britain closed in 1924
1906 establishments in Wales
1932 disestablishments in Wales